This article lists the fugal works of Johann Sebastian Bach, defined here as the fugues, fughettas, and canons, as well as other works containing fugal expositions but not denoted as fugues, such as some choral sections of the Mass in B minor, the St Matthew Passion, the St John Passion, and the cantatas.

This sub-list of the complete list of compositions by Johann Sebastian Bach is intended to facilitate the study of Bach's counterpoint techniques. Each work cited in this list will be annotated with the fugal subject(s) and any countersubjects in musical notation.

Cantata fugues
 BWV 6.1  – Choir Fugue, middle section: “Bleib bei uns, denn es will Abend werden”
 BWV 17.1 – Sinfonia and Fugue: “Wer Dank opfert, der preiset mich”
 BWV 21.2 – Choir Fugue: “Ich hatte viel Bekümmernis in meinem Herzen”
 BWV 21.6 – Preludium and permutation Fugue: “Was betrübst du dich, meine Seele”
 BWV 21.11 – Preludium and permutation Fugue: “Das Lamm, das erwürget ist”
 BWV 22.1 – Preludium and Fugue: “Sie aber vernahmen der keines”
 BWV 25.1 – Double Fugue: "Es ist nichts Gesundes an meinem Leibe"
 BWV 31.2 – Double Fugue: “Der Himmel lacht! Die Erde jubilieret”
 BWV 39.1 – Choir Fugue: “Brich dem Hungrigen dein Brot”
 BWV 45.1 – Preludium (3 Fughettas) bar 1 - 37 Fugue bar 54 - 77 Fugue bar 78 - 126 Preludium (3 Fughettas) bar 169 - 186: “Es ist dir gesagt, Mensch, was gut ist”
 BWV 46.1 – Preludium and Fugue: “Schauet doch und sheet”
 BWV 47.1 – Double Fugue: “Wer sich selbst erhöhet”
 BWV 50.1 – Permutation Fugue: “Nun ist das Heil und die Kraft”
 BWV 54.3 – Aria Double Fugue: “Wer Sünde tut, der ist vom Teufel”
 BWV 63.1 – “Denn der Strahl, so da einbricht” bars 132  - 159	
 BWV 63.7 – Two Double Fugues: Höchster, schau in Gnaden an””
 BWV 65.1 – Choir Triple Fugue: “Sie werden aus Saba alle kommen”
 BWV 67.1 – Sinfonia and Double Choir Fugue: “Halt im Gedächtnis Jesum Christ”
 BWV 68.5 – Double Choir Fugue: “Wer an ihn gläubet”
 BWV 69.1 – Double Fugue: “Lobe den Herrn, meine Seele”
 BWV 71.3 – Choir triple permutation Fugue: “Dein Alter sei wie deine Jugend”
 BWV 75.1 – Preludium and Double Fugue: “Die Elenden sollen essen”
 BWV 76.1 – Preludium and Fugue: “Die Himmel erzählen die Ehre Gottes”
 BWV 79.1 – Fugue: “Gott der Herr ist Sonn und Schild”
 BWV 102.1 – Sinfonia and Choir Fugue: “Sie haben ein härter Angesicht”
 BWV 103.1 – Sinfonia and Double choir Fugue: “Ihr werdet weinen und heulen”
 BWV 104.1 – Choir: “Du Hirte Israel, höre”
 BWV 105.1 – Preludium and permutation Fugue: “Herr, gehe nicht ins Gericht mit deinem Knecht” begins at m.47
 BWV 106.2a2 – Fugue: “In ihm leben, weben und sind wir”
 BWV 106.2d – Fugue stile antico: “Du mußt sterben!”
 BWV 106.4b – Double Fugue: “Durch Jesum Christum, amen”
 BWV 108.4 – Triple Choir Fugue: “Wenn aber jener, der Geist der Wahrheit”
 BWV 110.1 – Grave Fugue (BWV 1069) Grave:	“Unser Mund sei voll Lachens”
 BWV 119.1 – Fugue: “Preise, Jerusalem, den Herrn”
 BWV 119.7 – Fugue: “Der Herr hat Guts an uns getan”
 BWV 131.1 – Choir Fugue: “Aus der Tiefen rufe ich, Herr, zu dir”
 BWV 131.3 – Preludium and Choir Fugue: “Ich harre des Herrn, meine Seele harret”
 BWV 131.5 – Motet and Triple Fugue: “Israel, hoffe auf den Herrn”
 BWV 136.1 – Two Choir Fugues: “Erforsche mich, Gott”
 BWV 144.1 – Fugue: “Nimm, was dein ist, und gehe hin”
 BWV 147.1 – Sinfonia and Fugue: “Herz und Mund und Tat und Leben”
 BWV 148.1 – Double Choir Fugue: “Bringet dem Herrn Ehre seines Namens”
 BWV 150.2 – 3 Fugato's and Choir Fugue: “Nach dir, Herr, verlanget mich”
 BWV 150.4 – 1 Fugato and 1 Fugue: “Leite mich in deiner Wahrheit”
 BWV 150.6 – Preludium and Fugue: “Meine Augen sehen stets zu dem Herrn”
 BWV 152.1 – Permutation Fugue (BWV 536 Organ)	
 BWV 165.1 – Fugue: “O heilges Geist- und Wasserbad”
 BWV 171.1 – Choir Fugue: “Gott, wie dein Name”
 BWV 176.1 – Choir Fugue: “Es ist ein trotzig und verzagt Ding”
 BWV 179.1 – Motet mirror Double Fugue stile antico:	“Siehe zu, daß deine Gottesfurcht nicht Heuchelei sei”
 BWV 181.5 – Double Fugue: “Laß, Höchster, uns zu allen Zeiten”
 BWV 182.2 – Choir Fugue: “Himmelskönig, sei willkommen”
 BWV 186.1 – Choir Fugue: “Ärgre dich, o Seele, nicht”
 BWV 187.1 – Sinfonia and Choir Fugue: “Es wartet alles auf dich”
 BWV 191.1 – Double permutation Fugue: “Gloria in excelsis Deo”
 BWV 191.3 – Choir Fugue: “Sicut erat in principio”
 BWV 195.1 – Preludium and Fugue: “Dem Gerechten muß das Licht”
 BWV 196.2 – Choir Fugue: “Der Herr denket an uns und segnet uns”
 BWV 198.7 – Choir Fugue stile antico:	“An dir, du Vorbild großer Frauen”
 BWV 213.7 – Fugue: “Auf meinen Flügeln sollst du schweben”

Motets
 BWV 225.1 – Fugue: “Singet dem Herrn ein neues Lied”
 BWV 225.3 – Fugue: “Lobet den Herrn in seinen Taten”
 BWV 226.1a – Fugue: “Der Geist hilft unser Schwachheit auf”
 BWV 226.1b – Double Fugue: “Der aber die Herzen forschet”
 BWV 227.2 – Fugue: “Die nicht nach dem Fleische wandeln
 BWV 227.6 – Double Fugue: ”Ihr aber seid nicht fleischlich sondern geistlich”
 BWV 230.1 – Double Fugue + Simultaneous Fugue + Fugue: “Lobet den Herrn, alle Heiden"
 BWV Anh.160.1 – Fugue: “Jauchzet dem Herrn, alle Welt”

Liturgal works in Latin
 BWV 232 – Mass in B minor: Credo in unum deum, Confiteor unum baptisma, etc.
 BWV 233.6 – Double Choir Fugue: “Cum Sancto Spiritu”
 BWV 235.1 –	Double Fugue: “Kyrie eleison”
 BWV 236.1 – Missa: “Kyrie eleison”
 BWV 236.2 – Missa: ”Gloria in excelsis Deo”
 BWV 236.6 – Missa: “Cum Sancto Spiritu”
 BWV 243.7 – Choir Fugue: “Fecit potentiam in bracchio suo”

Quodlibet
 BWV 524 – "Ist doch der Backtrog" & "Ei, was ist das vor eine schöne Fuge!" Hochzeits-Quodlibet

Organ fugues
 BWV 531 – Prelude and Fugue in C major
 BWV 532 – Prelude and Fugue in D major
 BWV 532a – Fugue in D major (alternative version of BWV 532)
 BWV 533 – Prelude and Fugue in E minor
 BWV 534 – Prelude and Fugue in F minor
 BWV 535 – Prelude and Fugue in G minor
 BWV 535a – Prelude and Fugue in G minor (alternative, simplified version of BWV 535)
 BWV 536 – Prelude and Fugue in A major
 BWV 536a – Prelude and Fugue in A major (alternative version of BWV 536 based on the original manuscript)
 BWV 537 – Fantasia (Prelude) and Fugue in C minor
 BWV 538 – Toccata and Fugue in D minor ("Dorian")
 BWV 539 – Prelude and Fugue in D minor
 BWV 539a – Fugue in D minor (see BWV 1000 for the lute arrangement, movement 2 of BWV 1001 for the violin arrangement)
 BWV 540 – Toccata and Fugue in F major
 BWV 541 – Prelude and Fugue in G major
 BWV 542 – Fantasia and Fugue "Grand" in G minor
 BWV 542a – Fugue in G minor (alternative version of the fugue from BWV 542)
 BWV 543 – Prelude and Fugue in A minor
 BWV 544 – Prelude and Fugue in B minor
 BWV 545 – Prelude and Fugue in C major
 BWV 545a – Prelude and Fugue in C major (alternative version of BWV 545)
 BWV 545b – Prelude, Trio and Fugue in B-flat major (alternative version of BWV 545)
 BWV 546 – Prelude and Fugue in C minor
 BWV 547 – Prelude and Fugue in C major "9/8"
 BWV 548 – Prelude and Fugue in E minor "Wedge"
 BWV 549 – Prelude and Fugue in C minor
 BWV 550 – Prelude and Fugue in G major
 BWV 551 – Prelude and Fugue in A minor
 BWV 552 – Prelude and Fugue in E-flat major "St. Anne" (published in Clavier-Übung III)
 Eight Short Preludes and Fugues (553–560)
 BWV 553 – Short Prelude and Fugue in C major (spurious, possibly by Johann Tobias Krebs)
 BWV 554 – Short Prelude and Fugue in D minor (spurious, possibly by Johann Tobias Krebs)
 BWV 555 – Short Prelude and Fugue in E minor (spurious, possibly by Johann Tobias Krebs)
 BWV 556 – Short Prelude and Fugue in F major (spurious, possibly by Johann Tobias Krebs)
 BWV 557 – Short Prelude and Fugue in G major (spurious, possibly by Johann Tobias Krebs)
 BWV 558 – Short Prelude and Fugue in G minor (spurious, possibly by Johann Tobias Krebs)
 BWV 559 – Short Prelude and Fugue in A minor (spurious, possibly by Johann Tobias Krebs)
 BWV 560 – Short Prelude and Fugue in B-flat major (spurious, possibly by Johann Tobias Krebs)
 BWV 561 – Fantasia and Fugue in A minor (spurious)
 BWV 562 – Fantasia and Fugue in C minor (fugue unfinished)
 BWV 563 – Fantasia with imitation in B minor (spurious)
 BWV 564 – Toccata, Adagio and Fugue in C major
 BWV 565 – Toccata and Fugue in D minor
 BWV 566 – Toccata and Fugue in E major
 BWV 566a – Toccata in E major (earlier version of BWV 566)
 BWV 567 – Prelude in C major
 BWV 568 – Prelude in G major
 BWV 569 – Prelude in A minor
 BWV 570 – Fantasia in C major
 BWV 571 – Fantasia (Concerto) in G major (spurious)
 BWV 572 – Fantasia in G major
 BWV 573 – Fantasia in C major (incomplete, from the 1722 Notebook for Anna Magdalena Bach)
 BWV 574 – Fugue in C minor
 BWV 574a – Fugue in C minor (alternative version of BWV 574)
 BWV 575 – Fugue in C minor
 BWV 576 – Fugue in G major
 BWV 577 – Fugue in G major "à la Gigue" (spurious)
 BWV 578 – Fugue in G minor "Little"
 BWV 579 – Fugue on a theme by Arcangelo Corelli (from Op. 3, No. 4); in B Minor
 BWV 580 – Fugue in D major (spurious)
 BWV 581 – Fugue in G major (not by Bach, composed by Gottfried August Homilius)
 BWV 581a – Fugue in G major (spurious)
 BWV 582 – Passacaglia and Fugue in C minor
 BWV 668 – Chorale Quadruple Fugue: ”Vor deinen Thron tret' ich hiermit” Great Eighteen Chorale Preludes
 BWV 677 – Chorale Double Fughetta: “Allein Gott in der Höh’sei Ehr” Clavierübung III
 BWV 679 – Chorale Fughetta: “Diess sind die heil’gen zehn Gebot” Clavierübung III
 BWV 681 – Chorale Fughetta: “Wir glauben all’an einen Gott” Clavierübung III
 BWV 685 – Chorale Fugue: “Christ, unser Herr, zum Jordan kam” Clavierübung III
 BWV 689 – Chorale Fugue: “Jesus Christus, unser Heiland” Clavierübung III
 BWV 695 – Chorale Fughetta: “Christ lag in Todesbanden” The Kirnberger Collection
 BWV 696 – Chorale Fughetta: “Christum wir sollen loben schon / Was fürchst du Feind, Herodes, sehr” The Kirnberger Collection
 BWV 697 – Chorale Fughetta: “Belobet seist du, Jesu Christ” The Kirnberger Collection
 BWV 698 – Chorale Fughetta: “Herr Christ, der ein’ge Gottes Sohn” The Kirnberger Collection
 BWV 699 – Chorale Fughetta: “Nun komm, der Heiden Heiland” The Kirnberger Collection
 BWV 700 – Chorale Fughetta: “Vom Himmel hoch, da komm’ich her” The Kirnberger Collection
 BWV 701 – Chorale Fughetta: “Vom Himmel hoch, da komm’ich her” The Kirnberger Collection
 BWV 702 – Chorale Fughetta: “Das Jesulein soll doch mein Trost” The Kirnberger Collection
 BWV 703 – Chorale Fughetta: “Gottes Sohn ist kommen” The Kirnberger Collection
 BWV 704 – Chorale Fughetta: “Lob sei dem allmächt’gen Gott” The Kirnberger Collection
 BWV 705 – Motet Fugue: “Dirch Adams Fall ist ganz verderbt” The Kirnberger Collection
 BWV 712 – Chorale Fughettas: “In dich hab’ich gehoffet, Herr” The Kirnberger Collection
 BWV 713 – Chorale Fughettas: “Jesu, Meine Freude” The Kirnberger Collection
 BWV 802 – Duetto I Double Fugue Clavierübung III
 BWV 803 – Duetto II Fugue Clavierübung III
 BWV 804 – Duetto III Fugue Clavierübung III
 BWV 805 – Duetto IV Fugue Clavierübung III
 BWV 1086 – Canon concordia discors 
 BWV 1087 – 14 canons on the First Eight Notes of Goldberg Variations Ground

Keyboard fugues

The English Suites
 BWV 808.10 – Gigue Suite No. 3 in G minor
 BWV 810.7 – Gigue Suite No. 5 in E minor
 BWV 811.8 – Gigue Suite No. 6 in D minor

The French Suites
 BWV 812.7 – Gigue Suite No. 1 in D minor
 BWV 815.7 – Gigue Suite No. 4 in E♭ major
 BWV 816.7 – Gigue Suite No. 5 in G major

The Partitas 
 BWV 826.1 - Sinfonia Clavier-Übung I No. 2 in C minor
 BWV 826.6 - Capriccio Clavier-Übung I No. 2 in C minor
 BWV 827.7 - Gigue Clavier-Übung I No. 3 in A minor
 BWV 828.1 - Ouverture Clavier-Übung I No. 4 in D major
 BWV 828.7 - Gigue: Double Fugue Clavier-Übung I Partita No. 4 in D major
 BWV 829.7 - Gigue: Double Fugue Clavier-Übung I No. 5 in G major
 BWV 830.1 - Toccata: Prelude - Fugue - Postlude Clavier-Übung I No. 6 in E minor

Clavier-Übung II 
 BWV 831.1 - Ouverture in B flat minor

The Well-Tempered Clavier (BWV 846–893)
 BWV 846 – Well-Tempered Clavier, Book 1: Prelude and Fugue No. 1 in C major
 BWV 846a – Prelude and Fugue in C major (alternative version of BWV 846)
 BWV 847 – Well-Tempered Clavier, Book 1: Prelude and Fugue No. 2 in C minor
 BWV 848 – Well-Tempered Clavier, Book 1: Prelude and Fugue No. 3 in C-sharp major
 BWV 849 – Well-Tempered Clavier, Book 1: Prelude and Fugue No. 4 in C-sharp minor
 BWV 850 – Well-Tempered Clavier, Book 1: Prelude and Fugue No. 5 in D major
 BWV 851 – Well-Tempered Clavier, Book 1: Prelude and Fugue No. 6 in D minor
 BWV 852 – Well-Tempered Clavier, Book 1: Prelude and Fugue No. 7 in E-flat major
 BWV 853 – Well-Tempered Clavier, Book 1: Prelude and Fugue No. 8 in E-flat minor
 BWV 854 – Well-Tempered Clavier, Book 1: Prelude and Fugue No. 9 in E major
 BWV 855 – Well-Tempered Clavier, Book 1: Prelude and Fugue No. 10 in E minor
 BWV 855a – Prelude and Fugue in E minor (alternative version of BWV 855)
 BWV 856 – Well-Tempered Clavier, Book 1: Prelude and Fugue No. 11 in F major
 BWV 857 – Well-Tempered Clavier, Book 1: Prelude and Fugue No. 12 in F minor
 BWV 858 – Well-Tempered Clavier, Book 1: Prelude and Fugue No. 13 in F-sharp major
 BWV 859 – Well-Tempered Clavier, Book 1: Prelude and Fugue No. 14 in F-sharp minor
 BWV 860 – Well-Tempered Clavier, Book 1: Prelude and Fugue No. 15 in G major
 BWV 861 – Well-Tempered Clavier, Book 1: Prelude and Fugue No. 16 in G minor
 BWV 862 – Well-Tempered Clavier, Book 1: Prelude and Fugue No. 17 in A-flat major
 BWV 863 – Well-Tempered Clavier, Book 1: Prelude and Fugue No. 18 in G-sharp minor
 BWV 864 – Well-Tempered Clavier, Book 1: Prelude and Fugue No. 19 in A major
 BWV 865 – Well-Tempered Clavier, Book 1: Prelude and Fugue No. 20 in A minor
 BWV 866 – Well-Tempered Clavier, Book 1: Prelude and Fugue No. 21 in B-flat major
 BWV 867 – Well-Tempered Clavier, Book 1: Prelude and Fugue No. 22 in B-flat minor
 BWV 868 – Well-Tempered Clavier, Book 1: Prelude and Fugue No. 23 in B major
 BWV 869 – Well-Tempered Clavier, Book 1: Prelude and Fugue No. 24 in B minor
 BWV 870 – Well-Tempered Clavier, Book 2: Prelude and Fugue No. 1 in C major
 BWV 870a – Prelude and Fugue in C major (alternative version of BWV 870)
 BWV 870b – Prelude in C major (alternative version of BWV 870)
 BWV 871 – Well-Tempered Clavier, Book 2: Prelude and Fugue No. 2 in C minor
 BWV 872 – Well-Tempered Clavier, Book 2: Prelude and Fugue No. 3 in C-sharp major
 BWV 872a – Prelude and Fugue in C-sharp major (alternative version of BWV 872)
 BWV 873 – Well-Tempered Clavier, Book 2: Prelude and Fugue No. 4 in C-sharp minor
 BWV 874 – Well-Tempered Clavier, Book 2: Prelude and Fugue No. 5 in D major
 BWV 875 – Well-Tempered Clavier, Book 2: Prelude and Fugue No. 6 in D minor
 BWV 875a – Prelude in D minor (alternative version of BWV 875)
 BWV 876 – Well-Tempered Clavier, Book 2: Prelude and Fugue No. 7 in E-flat major
 BWV 877 – Well-Tempered Clavier, Book 2: Prelude and Fugue No. 8 in D-sharp minor
 BWV 878 – Well-Tempered Clavier, Book 2: Prelude and Fugue No. 9 in E major
 BWV 879 – Well-Tempered Clavier, Book 2: Prelude and Fugue No. 10 in E minor
 BWV 880 – Well-Tempered Clavier, Book 2: Prelude and Fugue No. 11 in F major
 BWV 881 – Well-Tempered Clavier, Book 2: Prelude and Fugue No. 12 in F minor
 BWV 882 – Well-Tempered Clavier, Book 2: Prelude and Fugue No. 13 in F-sharp major
 BWV 883 – Well-Tempered Clavier, Book 2: Prelude and Fugue No. 14 in F-sharp minor
 BWV 884 – Well-Tempered Clavier, Book 2: Prelude and Fugue No. 15 in G major
 BWV 885 – Well-Tempered Clavier, Book 2: Prelude and Fugue No. 16 in G minor
 BWV 886 – Well-Tempered Clavier, Book 2: Prelude and Fugue No. 17 in A-flat major
 BWV 887 – Well-Tempered Clavier, Book 2: Prelude and Fugue No. 18 in G-sharp minor
 BWV 888 – Well-Tempered Clavier, Book 2: Prelude and Fugue No. 19 in A major
 BWV 889 – Well-Tempered Clavier, Book 2: Prelude and Fugue No. 20 in A minor
 BWV 890 – Well-Tempered Clavier, Book 2: Prelude and Fugue No. 21 in B-flat major
 BWV 891 – Well-Tempered Clavier, Book 2: Prelude and Fugue No. 22 in B-flat minor
 BWV 892 – Well-Tempered Clavier, Book 2: Prelude and Fugue No. 23 in B major
 BWV 893 – Well-Tempered Clavier, Book 2: Prelude and Fugue No. 24 in B minor

Preludes and fugues, toccatas and fantasias (BWV 894–923)
 BWV 894 – Prelude and Fugue in A minor
 BWV 895 – Prelude and Fugue in A minor
 BWV 896 – Prelude and Fugue in A major
 BWV 897 – Prelude and Fugue in A minor (spurious)
 BWV 898 – Prelude and Fugue in B-flat major on the name B-A-C-H (doubtful)
 BWV 899 – Prelude and Fughetta in D minor (doubtful)
 BWV 900 – Prelude and Fughetta in E minor
 BWV 901 – Prelude and Fughetta in F major
 BWV 902 – Prelude and Fughetta in G major
 BWV 902a – Prelude in G major (alternative version of BWV 902)
 BWV 903 – Chromatic Fantasia and Fugue in D minor
 BWV 903a – Chromatic Fantasia in D minor (alternative version of BWV 903)
 BWV 904 – Fantasia and Fugue in A minor
 BWV 905 – Fantasia and Fugue in D minor
 BWV 906 – Fantasia and Fugue in C minor (Fugue unfinished)
 BWV 907 – Fantasia and Fughetta in B-flat major
 BWV 908 – Fantasia and Fughetta in D major
 BWV 909 – Concerto and fugue in C minor
 BWV 910 – Toccata in F-sharp minor
 BWV 911 – Toccata in C minor
 BWV 912 – Toccata in D major
 BWV 913 – Toccata in D minor
 BWV 914 – Toccata in E minor
 BWV 915 – Toccata in G minor
 BWV 916 – Toccata in G major

Fugues and fughettas (BWV 944–962)
 BWV 944 – Fugue in A minor
 BWV 945 – Fugue in E minor (spurious)
 BWV 946 – Fugue in C major
 BWV 947 – Fugue in A minor
 BWV 948 – Fugue in D minor
 BWV 949 – Fugue in A major
 BWV 950 – Fugue in A major on a theme by Tomaso Albinoni
 BWV 951 – Fugue in B minor on a theme by Tomaso Albinoni
 BWV 951a – Fugue in B minor (alternative version of BWV 951)
 BWV 952 – Fugue in C major
 BWV 953 – Fugue in C major
 BWV 954 – Fugue in B-flat major on a theme by Johann Adam Reincken
 BWV 955 – Fugue in B-flat major
 BWV 956 – Fugue in E minor
 BWV 957 – Fugue in G major
 BWV 958 – Fugue in A minor
 BWV 959 – Fugue in A minor
 BWV 960 – Fugue in E minor
 BWV 961 – Fughetta in C minor
 BWV 962 – Fughetta in E minor

Lute fugues
 BWV 995.1 - Präludium – Très Vite Lute suite in G minor, a transcription of Cello suite No. 5 BWV 1011
 BWV 997 – Lute Suite No. 2 in C minor (Fuge)
 BWV 998 – Prelude, Fugue and Allegro in E-flat major
 BWV 1000 – Fugue in G minor

Concerto movements
 BWV 1047 – Brandenburg Concerto No. 2 in F major: 3. Allegro assai
 BWV 1050 – Brandenburg Concerto No.5 in D Major: 3. Allegro
 BWV 1061 – Concerto for 2 harpsichords and strings in C major: 3. Fuga

Sonata movements

Sonatas and partitas for solo violin (BWV 1001–1006)
 BWV 1001 – Sonata No. 1 in G minor: 2. Fuga (Allegro) – Transcribed for organ as BWV 539 and for lute as BWV 1000
 BWV 1003 – Sonata No. 2 in A minor: 2. Fuga – Transcribed for harpsichord as BWV 964
 BWV 1005 – Sonata No. 3 in C major: 2. Fuga (Alla breve)

Sonatas for violin and harpsichord (BWV 1014–1019)
 BWV 1014 – Sonata No. 1 in B minor: 2. Allegro and 4. Allegro
 BWV 1015 – Sonata No. 2 in A major: 2. Allegro assai and 4. Presto
 BWV 1016 – Sonata No. 3 in E major: 2. Allegro and 4. Allegro
 BWV 1017 – Sonata No. 4 in C minor: 2. Allegro and 4. Allegro
 BWV 1018 – Sonata No. 5 in F minor: 2. Allegro and 4. Vivace
 BWV 1019 – Sonata No. 6 in G major: 5. Allegro

Other sonatas
 BWV 965 – Sonata in A minor: 2. Fugue
 BWV 1021 – Sonata in G major: 4. Presto

Cello Suites
 BWV 1011 Prelude Suite No. 5 in C minor, in French Overture AB form, the B part is a single-line Fugue

Canons and fugal works in the last two chapters of the Bach-Werke-Verzeichnis (1998)

|- id="BWV Chapter 12" style="background: #D8D8D8;"
| data-sort-value="1071.z99" | 12.
| data-sort-value="437.000" colspan="8" | Canons (see also: List of canons by Johann Sebastian Bach)
| data-sort-value="1257a" | Up ↑
|- id="BWV 1072"
| data-sort-value="1072.000" | 1072
| data-sort-value="437.001" | 12.
| 
| Canon trias harmonica a 8
| D maj.
| data-sort-value="Vx8" | 8V
| data-sort-value="000.45 1: 131" | 451: 131
| data-sort-value="VIII/01: 003, 006" | VIII/l: 3, 6
| Friedrich Wilhelm Marpurg. Abhandlung von der Fuge Vol. 2. Berlin (1754), TAB XXXVII
| 
|- id="BWV 1073" style="background: #E3F6CE;"
| data-sort-value="1073.000" | 1073
| data-sort-value="437.002" | 12.
| 1713-08-02
| Canon â 4. Voc: perpetuus
| A min.
| data-sort-value="Vx4" | 4V
| data-sort-value="000.45 1: 132" | 451: 132
| data-sort-value="VIII/01: 003" | VIII/l: 3
| in US-CAh bMS Eng 870 (35b)Neumann/Schulze, Dok I, Nr. 147Spitta I: 386
| 
|- id="BWV 1074" style="background: #E3F6CE;"
| data-sort-value="1074.000" | 1074
| data-sort-value="437.003" | 12.
| data-sort-value="1727-07-01" | 1727
| Canon a 4 (for )
| A min.
| data-sort-value="Vx4" | 4V
| data-sort-value="000.45 1: 134" | 451: 134
| data-sort-value="VIII/01: 003" | VIII/l: 3
| Johann Mattheson. Der vollkommene Capellmeister. Hamburg (1739), p. 412Friedrich Wilhelm Marpurg. Abhandlung von der Fuge nach den Grundsätzen und Exemplen der besten deutschen und ausländischen Meister entworfen ... Vol. 2. Berlin (1754), TAB XXXIII, Fig. 2–3Spitta II: p. 478 / 798
| 
|- id="BWV 1075" style="background: #E3F6CE;"
| data-sort-value="1075.000" | 1075
| data-sort-value="438.001" | 12.
| 1734-01-10
| Canon a 2. perpetuus
| D maj.
| data-sort-value="Vx2" | 2V
| 
| data-sort-value="VIII/01: 003" | VIII/l: 3
| 
| 
|- id="BWV 1076" style="background: #E3F6CE;"
| data-sort-value="1076.000" | 1076
| data-sort-value="438.002" | 12.
| data-sort-value="1746-07-01" | 1746
| Canon triplex a 6
| G maj.
| data-sort-value="Vx6" | 6V
| data-sort-value="000.45 1: 138" | 451: 138
| data-sort-value="VIII/01: 003" | VIII/l: 3
| data-sort-value="after BWV 1087/13" | after BWV 1087/13Johann Sebastian Bach. Canon triplex à 6 Voc:. Leipzig (1747)ClementNeumann/Schulze, Dok II, Nr. 559Nowak. "Ein Bach-Fund" in Fontes artis musicae (1966), pp. 95ffWolff Stile antico
| 
|- id="BWV 1077" style="background: #E3F6CE;"
| data-sort-value="1077.000" | 1077
| data-sort-value="438.003" | 12.
| 1747-10-15
| data-sort-value="Canon doppio sopr' il soggetto" | Canone doppio sopr' il soggetto (dedicated to )
| G maj.
| data-sort-value="Vx5" | 4V Bc
| 
| data-sort-value="VIII/01: 004" | VIII/1: 4IX/2: 81
| data-sort-value="after BWV 1087/11" | after BWV 1087/11Neumann/Schulze, Dok I, Nr. 174
| 
|- id="BWV 1078" style="background: #F6E3CE;"
| data-sort-value="1078.000" | 1078
| data-sort-value="439.002" | 12.
| 1749-03-01
| Canon Fa Mi, et Mi Fa est Tota Musica, a.k.a. Canon super Fa Mi, a 7. post Tempus Musicum
| F maj.
| data-sort-value="Vx7" | 7V Bc
| data-sort-value="000.45 1: 136" | 451: 136
| data-sort-value="VIII/01: 004" | VIII/l: 4
| data-sort-value="in SBB P 0611" | in SBB P 611Neumann/Schulze, Dok I, Nr. 177
| 
|- id="BWV 1086" style="background: #F6E3CE;"
| data-sort-value="1086.000" | 1086
| data-sort-value="439.003" | 12.
| data-sort-value="1750-04-15" | 1750?
| Canon Concordia discors
| D maj.
| data-sort-value="Vx2" | 2V
| 
| data-sort-value="VIII/01: 004" | VIII/l: 4III/1: VIII
| in SLB Dresden R 291sNBA VIII/1 Krit. Bericht: 36fReich. "Johann Sebastian Bach und Johann Gottfried Müthel – zwei unbekannte Kanons" in Mf 1960, pp. 449f
| 
|- style="background: #E3F6CE;"
| data-sort-value="1087.000" | 1087
| data-sort-value="439.004" | 12.
| data-sort-value="1748-01-01" | 1747/1748 or earlier
| data-sort-value="Canonx14 on the first eight notes of the Goldberg ground" | 14 Canons on the first eight notes of the Goldberg ground
| G maj.
| data-sort-value="Vx6" | 6V
| 
| data-sort-value="V/02: 119" | V/2: 119
| data-sort-value="after BWV 0988/1" | after BWV 988/1; /11 → BWV 1077; /13 → 1076; in BN Paris Ms. 17669, Bl. 18vBN Paris Ms. 17669, Bl. 18v at Gárdonyi. "Zu einigen Kanons von J. S. Bach" in Studia Musicologica: Academiae Seientiarum Hungaricae Vol. 28 (1986), pp. 321–324Wolff. "Bach's Handexemplar of the Goldberg Variations" in JAMS (1976), pp. 224ff
| 
|- id="BWV Chapter 13" style="background: #D8D8D8;"
| data-sort-value="1078.z99" | 13.
| data-sort-value="442.000" colspan="8" | Musical Offering, Art of the Fugue (see also: List of late contrapuntal works by Johann Sebastian Bach)
| data-sort-value="1264a" | Up ↑
|- style="background: #E3F6CE;"
| data-sort-value="1079.000" | 1079
| data-sort-value="442.001" | 13.
| 1747-07-07
| Musical Offering
| 
| Kb Fl 2Vl Bc
| data-sort-value="000.31 2" | 312
| data-sort-value="VIII/01: 046" | VIII/1: 46
| 
| 
|- style="background: #E3F6CE;"
| data-sort-value="1080.100" | 1080.1
| data-sort-value="442.002" rowspan="2" | 13.
| data-sort-value="1745-12-31" | 
| The Art of Fugue (autograph)
|  rowspan="2" |
| data-sort-value="Hs?" rowspan="2" | Hc (?)
| data-sort-value="000.50" | 251
| data-sort-value="VIII/02: 003" | VIII/2.1
| data-sort-value="in SBB P 0200" | → BWV 1080.2
| 
|- style="background: #E3F6CE;"
| data-sort-value="1080.200" | 1080.2
| data-sort-value="1747-12-31" | 
| The Art of Fugue (print version)
| data-sort-value="000.50" | 47
| data-sort-value="VIII/02: 003" | VIII/2.2
| data-sort-value="in SBB P 0200" | after BWV 1080.1
| 
|}

Canons (BWV 1072–1078)

 BWV 1072 – Canon trias harmonica a 8
 BWV 1073 – Canon a 4 perpetuus
 BWV 1074 – Canon a 4
 BWV 1075 – Canon a 2 perpetuus
 BWV 1076 – Canon triplex a 6
 BWV 1077 – Canone doppio sopr'il soggetto
 BWV 1078 – Canon super fa mi a 7 post tempus musicum
 Later additions to the BWV catalogue:
 BWV 1086 – Canon concordia discors
 BWV 1087 – 14 canons on the First Eight Notes of Goldberg Variations Ground (discovered 1974)

Late contrapuntal works (BWV 1079–1080)

 BWV 1079 – The Musical Offering (Musikalisches Opfer)
 BWV 1080 – The Art of Fugue (Die Kunst der Fuge)

Doubtful fugues
 BWV 131a – Fugue in G minor, BWV 131a for organ. Doubtful arrangement of a choral fugue from BWV 131
 BWV 1026 – Fugue in G minor for violin and harpsichord. Once considered spurious, current thinking is that this is an early work by Bach.

Notes

 
Fugal works by Johann Sebastian Bach, List of